The University of Puerto Rico (UPR) is the main public university system of Puerto Rico and a government-owned corporation of Puerto Rico. It consists of 11 campuses and has approximately 58,000 students and 5,300 faculty members. UPR has the largest and most diverse academic offerings in Puerto Rico and the Caribbean, with 472 academic programs of which 32 lead to a doctorate.

Campuses

See also

 School of Tropical Medicine
 2010 University of Puerto Rico Strike

References

External links
  Official website
 History of police/military violence at the University of Puerto Rico at the Río Piedras campus
  Police/student Recent History of Violence at the University of Puerto Rico, Río Piedras (UPRRP) (main campus)

.
University of Puerto Rico campuses
Puerto Rico, campuses
University of Puerto Rico